The 2009–10 Amlin Challenge Cup was the 14th season of the European Challenge Cup, the annual rugby union European club competition for clubs from six nations in European rugby. It started on 8 October 2009 at Sixways Stadium in Worcester with Worcester Warriors hosting Montpellier, and ended with the final at Stade Vélodrome in Marseille on 23 May 2010. The reigning champions were Northampton Saints, who did not defend their title as they qualified for the 2009–10 Heineken Cup. Cardiff Blues won the trophy after a 28–21 win against Toulon.

Teams
Five English teams and eight French teams competed because an English team – Leicester Tigers – progressed farther in the 2008–09 Heineken Cup than any French or Italian team.

Other countries will have their usual number of teams: Ireland one, Romania one and one from Spain.

Pool stage

The draw for the pool stages took place on 15 June 2009. The seeding system was the same as for the 2008–09 tournament. The 20 competing teams were ranked based on past Heineken Cup and European Challenge Cup performance, with each pool receiving one team from each Tier. The requirement to have only one team per country in each pool was, however, still apply (with the exception of the inclusion of the sixth, seventh and eight French teams).

Beginning with this season's competition, only the pool winners advanced to the knockout stage. They were joined by three clubs from the 2009–10 Heineken Cup, specifically the third through fifth highest-ranking teams that finished second in their pool (the top two second-place teams entered the Heineken Cup knockout stage).

Team seedings
Seeding was determined by the teams' position in the ERC Rankings at the time of the pool draw in June 2009.

{| class="wikitable"
|+ Key to colours
|-
|bgcolor="#ccffcc"|    
|Winner of each pool, advanced to quarterfinalsAlong with 3rd, 4th and 5th best runners up in the Heineken Cup group stages.Seed # in parentheses
|}

Pool 1

Pool 2

Pool 3

Pool 4

Pool 5

Seeding
 Bare numbers indicate Challenge quarterfinal seeding.
 Numbers with "HC" indicate Heineken Cup 3rd-5th Runners-Up.

Knock-out stage

Quarter-finals

Semi-finals

Final
On 28 April 2010, the competition organiser, European Rugby Cup, announced that the final would be held on 23 May. The time was set at 13:00 UTC (14:00 BST, 15:00 CEST), but the location would depend on the result of the Connacht–Toulon semi-final. Since Toulon won, the final was held at Stade Vélodrome in Marseille.

Cardiff Blues were designated as the home team for the final. However, it was an effective home game for Toulon; Stade Vélodrome hosted two of that club's matches in their domestic season. Cardiff Blues won the final against Toulon by 28–21.

See also
2009–10 Heineken Cup

Notes and references

External links
2009–10 European Challenge Cup Official Site

 
2009–10 rugby union tournaments for clubs
2009–10 in European rugby union
2009–10 in Irish rugby union
2009–10 in English rugby union
2009–10 in French rugby union
2009–10 in Italian rugby union
2009–10 in Welsh rugby union
2009–10 in Romanian rugby union
2009–10 in Spanish rugby union
2009